Ángel Jeremy Márquez Castañeda (born 21 June 2000) is a Mexican professional footballer who plays as a midfielder for Liga MX club Atlas.

Career statistics

Club

Honours
Atlas
Liga MX: Apertura 2021, Clausura 2022
Campeón de Campeones: 2022

References

External links
Ángel Márquez at Football Database
Ángel Márquez at Soccerway

Atlas F.C. footballers
2000 births
Living people
Association football forwards
Mexican footballers